Gorgaburu is the second highest peak of Ajodhya Hills at an altitude of 677 meters. It is the second highest point in southern part of West Bengal. It is located at Western plateau and highlands of Purulia district. 

Hills of West Bengal
Purulia district